Uvari is a coastal village in Thisayanvilai Taluk, Tirunelveli district, Tamil Nadu, India. It is also called Karaichuthu Uvari.

History

According to Tamil history, the citizens of Uvari were called Bharathar's of the Neithal (ocean land) World. Uvari's historical name was Obeer Pattanam. It was ruled by the Pandyan dynasty. Suyambulingaswamy Temple, a renowned Hindu temple is located here, this temple is estimated to be atleast 500 to 1000 years old.

In the 1530s, Portuguese and Spanish missionaries from Goa which includes Saint Francis Xavier arrived here and converted many Bharathars the Fishermans to the Roman Catholic religion. The Portuguese priests, acting as godfathers,baptized them in the name of Lord and gave them surnames such as Fernando to the converted. Pandya retains a fish on its flag, a symbol of this era.

Legend has it that the crew of a Portuguese ship that sailed near Uvari in the seventeenth century contracted cholera. In an attempt to avert death, a carpenter aboard the ship carved an image of Saint Anthony (Anthony of Padua). Soon after, the entire crew were restored to health. When the ship docked at Uvari, the sailors placed the statue inside a hut in the village. In the 1940s, the villagers built a church with the original statue of St. Anthony holding the infant Jesus in his hand. St Anthony the Saint of Crore Miracles is said to perform many miracles daily for the people who flock there with faith in his intercession, therefore the church was upgraded to a Major shrine. This Church in Uvari is visited by Hindus , Muslims and Christians from all over the world

Geography
Uvari is surrounded by the village Idaiyangudi at North, Navaladi at West , karachithuvari at East and the Bay of Bengal Sea at South. The rainy season starts between October and January. Uvari is rich in mineral resources like limestone, Ilmenite, and red garnet sands.

Facilities 
Two hospitals are located in Uvari.

 St. Joseph Hospital Missionary
 Government Primary Healthcare Hospital

An Canara bank is located in Uvari. (with ATM)

 Post Office (627651) BSNL Telephone Exchange (277 series).

SCHOOLS:-

1 - Malaviya Vidya Kendram School

2 - St.Mary's Boys primary school

3 - St.Joseph Girls school

4 - St.Mary's Higher secondary school

Landmarks 

Suyambulingaswamy Temple, a sacred holy hindu temple is located here worshipped by Hindu communities from all around this place and from neighbourhood districts.

Uvari is home to the Roman catholic christians

St. Antony's major Shrine church, a wonderful Catholic church also called as place of  Crore Miracles by pilgrims is dedicated to St. Anthony of Padua. The selva madha church which is also called as Kappal Matha Church, is in the form of a ship carrying an aeroplane which is of an excellent architecture is viewed by so many tourists and pilgrims all around the world , it is also noted as one of best view site of govt of Tamilnadu Tourism .  The original church of St. Mary was damaged by sea erosion and replaced by this one, built in 1974. Uvari features Mainly four Churches and many grottos which are get viewed by more enormous number of tourists and pilgrims all around the Universe.

Transport

The village has no train service.

References

External links

Cities and towns in Tirunelveli district